Briscoe v. LaHue, 460 U.S. 325 (1983), was a United States Supreme Court case in which the Court held that Title 42 U.S.C. § 1983 did not authorize a convicted state defendant to assert a claim for damages against a police officer for giving perjured testimony at the defendant's criminal trial.

External links
 

United States Supreme Court cases
United States Supreme Court cases of the Burger Court
1983 in United States case law
United States tort case law